Roshchupkina is a surname. Notable people with the surname include:

 Nadezhda Roshchupkina (born 1963), Russian sprinter
 Natalya Roshchupkina (born 1978), Russian heptathlete